Audrey Gladys Donnithorne (27 November 1922, Santai County, Sichuan, Republic of China – 9 June 2020, Hong Kong) was a British-Chinese political economist and missionary, prominent in her efforts to rebuild the Catholic Church in China after the Cultural Revolution.

Early life and education

The daughter of evangelical Anglican missionaries Vyvyan Donnithorne and Gladys Emma Ingram, born in 1922 at a Quaker mission hospital in Santai, Audrey grew up in Sichuan where she and her parents were kidnapped by bandits when she was two years old. They and six others were led into the mountains with their necks in a halter. In 1927, the family was forced to leave China as Kuomintang forces pushed northwards.

When World War II broke out, she headed from the UK, where she received education, to France and sailed to China to her family in 1940. She converted to Roman Catholicism in 1943, and was baptised at the Cathedral of the Immaculate Conception in Chengdu. However, when Japanese forces advanced on Sichuan, she went to India by plane. Back in the UK, Donnithorne worked for the War Office. She then moved to Somerville College, Oxford where she studied philosophy, politics and economics (PPE), where she babysat for G. E. M. Anscombe and was a contemporary of Margaret Thatcher.

Career
Donnithorne then became a successful academic at University College London and in 1969 she moved to Australia to work at the Australian National University where she was head of the Contemporary China Center. Her magnum opus was China's Economic System. She was in Israel when the Yom Kippur War broke out in 1973. In Australia she received Vietnamese boat people in her house. After her retirement in 1985 she moved to Hong Kong. In 1997, the Chinese government expelled her from the mainland for her activities; she remained in contact with church leaders there. She worked with the 2008 Sichuan earthquake victimsestablishing a fund for the rebuilding of churches and Catholic facilities with the backing of Hong Kong cardinal Joseph Zenand with the Church in China. She also became an honorary member of the Centre of Asian Studies at the University of Hong Kong. She later wrote memoirs, entitled China, In Life's Foreground.

The Vatican awarded her the Pro Ecclesia et Pontifice medal in 1993, and in 1995, she became an honorary member of the Paris Foreign Missions Society (MEP). She died in Hong Kong on 9 June 2020. A memorial Mass was held in Sichuan's Nanchong Diocese on 10 June, the day after her death, conducted by Bishop .

Selected works
China in Life's Foreground, Australian Scholarly Publishing, 2019, 
Centre-Provincial Economic Relations in China, Contemporary China Centre, Research School of Pacific Studies, Australian National University, 1981
The Budget and the Plan in China: Central-Local Economic Relations, Australian National University Press, 1972
China's Economic System, Praeger Publishers, 1967; Reprint edition (2016): Taylor & Francis,  
(with George Cyril Allen) Western enterprise in Indonesia and Malaya: a study in economic development, 1957; Reprint edition (2021): Creative Media Partners, 
(with George Cyril Allen) Western enterprise in Far Eastern economic development: China and Japan, 1954; Reprint edition (2015): Routledge,

See also 
 Anglicanism in Sichuan
 Catholic Church in Sichuan
 Catholic Church in Hong Kong

References

1922 births
2020 deaths
Alumni of Somerville College, Oxford
20th-century English women
English Roman Catholic missionaries
Converts to Roman Catholicism from Anglicanism
People from Mianyang
British women economists
20th-century British economists
Academics of University College London
Academic staff of the Australian National University
English expatriates in China
English expatriates in Hong Kong
Anglicanism in Sichuan
Catholic Church in Sichuan